Tetraopes texanus is a species of beetle in the family Cerambycidae. It was described by George Henry Horn in 1878. It is known from Mexico and the United States.

References

Tetraopini
Beetles described in 1878